Christian VIII (18 September 1786 – 20 January 1848) was King of Denmark from 1839 to 1848 and, as Christian Frederick, King of Norway in 1814.

Christian Frederick was the eldest son of Hereditary Prince Frederick, a younger son of King Frederick V of Denmark and Norway. As his cousin Frederick VI had no sons, Christian Frederick was heir presumptive to the throne from 1808.

Early years

Birth and family

Prince Christian Frederick of Denmark and Norway was born on 18 September 1786 at Christiansborg Palace, the principal residence of the Danish Monarchy on the island of Slotsholmen in central Copenhagen. He was officially the eldest son of Hereditary Prince Frederick of Denmark and Norway and Duchess Sophia Frederica of Mecklenburg-Schwerin. His father was a younger son of the deceased King Frederick V of Denmark-Norway and his second wife, Duchess Juliana Maria of Brunswick-Wolfenbüttel, and his mother was a daughter of Duke Louis of Mecklenburg-Schwerin.

In the family, however, it was widely acknowledged that the biological father most likely was the Hereditary Prince's aide-de-camp and hofmarschall . In a letter written by Crown Prince Frederick to his brother-in-law Duke Frederick Christian II of Augustenburg in 1805, he thus mentions the Hereditary Prince's goodwill towards his hofmarschall and continues: 

When Prince Christian Frederick was born, his father's half-brother, Christian VII, was the King of Denmark-Norway, but due to the king's mental illness, he was not able to rule himself. From 1772, Hereditary Prince Frederick had ruled together with his mother, the Dowager Queen Juliane Marie, and their adviser Ove Høegh-Guldberg. In 1784, however, the king's only son, the young Crown Prince Frederick (later King Frederick VI), had seized power in a palace revolution and was now the real ruler. In Prince Christian Frederick's childhood, his family had a strained relationship with the Crown Prince and his family as a result of these power struggles, but gradually the relationship between the two branches of the royal family was normalized.

Childhood and education

Prince Christian Frederick spent the first years of his life with his siblings in the vast and magnificent Baroque Christiansborg Palace. As the family's summer residence, Hereditary Prince Friedrich in 1789 bought the smaller and elegant country house, Sorgenfri Palace, on the banks of the small river Mølleåen in Kongens Lyngby, north of Copenhagen. On 26 February 1794, the family lost their Copenhagen home, as Christiansborg Palace was devastated by a fire. Instead the Hereditary Prince bought the Levetzau's Palace, an 18th-century town house which forms part of the Amalienborg Palace complex in the district Frederiksstaden in central Copenhagen. In november of the same year, when he was eight years old, his mother, who had long suffered from a fragile health, died at Sorgenfri the age of just 36 years.

Christian Frederick was raised conservatively according to the guidelines of minister Ove Høegh-Guldberg, who had been ousted from government in 1784 along with the hereditary prince. His upbringing was marked by a thorough and broad-spectrum education with exposure to artists and scientists who were linked to his father's court. He inherited the talents of his highly gifted mother, and his love of science and art was instilled at an early age and would follow him throughout his life. His amiability and handsome features are said to have made him very popular in Copenhagen.

He was confirmed on 22 May 1803 in the chapel of Frederiksberg Palace together with his sisters Princess Juliane Sophie and Princess Louise Charlotte. A year and a half later, on 7 December 1805, the children's father, Hereditary Prince Frederick, died at the age of 52, and the nineteen-year-old Prince Christian Frederik inherited his place as second-in-line in the succession as well as the two residences, Levetzau's Palace and Sorgenfri Palace. As King Christian VII died on 13 March 1808, Crown Prince Frederick became king of Denmark and Norway as Frederick VI. Since the new king still had no male descendants, Christian Frederick thus became heir presumptive to the throne.

First marriage

On a visit to his mother's relatives in Mecklenburg, Prince Christian Frederick stayed at his uncle's court in Schwerin, where he fell in love with his cousin, Duchess Charlotte Frederica of Mecklenburg-Schwerin. Charlotte Frederica was a daughter of the reigning Duke Friedrich Franz I of Mecklenburg-Schwerin, and Princess Louise of Saxe-Gotha-Altenburg. They married two years later, on 21 June 1806, at Ludwigslust.

The young couple first settled at Plön Castle in the Duchy of Holstein. It was here, that Charlotte Frederica gave birth to their first-born son, Prince Christian Frederick, who was born and died on 8 April 1807. From 1808 the couple lived in Copenhagen, where they took residence partly at Levetzau's Palace at Amalienborg, and partly at Sorgenfri Palace. On 6 October 1808, their second son and only surviving child was born, Prince Frederick Carl Christian, the future King Frederick VII of Denmark.

Nonetheless, their married life was unhappy. Charlotte Frederica was described as very beautiful in her youth, but her character was thought to be moody, capricious, frivolous and mythomaniac, qualities that were later said to recur in her son, Frederick VII. Her alleged affair with her singing teacher, Swiss-born singer and composer Édouard Du Puy, led to her removal from the court. For this reason, her husband divorced her in 1810, sent her into internal exile in the town of Horsens, and prohibited her from ever seeing her son again.

King of Norway

In May 1813, as the heir presumptive of the kingdoms of Denmark and Norway, Christian was sent as stattholder (Governor-general of Norway) to Norway to promote the loyalty of the Norwegians to the House of Oldenburg, which had been very badly shaken by the disastrous results of Frederick VI's adhesion to the falling fortunes of Napoleon I of France. Christian did all he could personally to strengthen the bonds between the Norwegians and the royal house of Denmark. Though his endeavours were opposed by the so-called Swedish party, which desired a dynastic union with Sweden, he placed himself at the head of the Norwegian party of independence after the Treaty of Kiel had forced the king to cede Norway to the king of Sweden. He was elected Regent of Norway by an assembly of notables on 16 February 1814.

This election was confirmed by the Norwegian Constituent Assembly convoked at Eidsvoll on 10 April, and on 17 May the constitution was signed and Christian was unanimously elected king of Norway under the name Christian Frederick (Kristian Frederik in Norwegian).
Christian next attempted to interest the great powers in Norway's cause, but without success. On being pressed by the commissioners of the allied powers to bring about a union between Norway and Sweden in accordance with the terms of the treaty of Kiel, and then return to Denmark, he replied that, as a constitutional king, he could do nothing without the consent of the parliament (Storting), which would not be convoked until there was a suspension of hostilities on the part of Sweden.

Sweden refused Christian's conditions and a short military campaign ensued in which the Norwegian army was defeated by the forces of the Swedish crown prince Charles John. The brief war concluded with the Convention of Moss on 14 August 1814. By the terms of this treaty, King Christian Frederick transferred executive power to the Storting, then abdicated the throne and returned to Denmark. The Storting in its turn adopted the constitutional amendments necessary to allow for a personal union with Sweden and on 4 November elected Charles XIII of Sweden as the new king of Norway, Charles II.

Danish heir presumptive

Second marriage 

Upon his return to Denmark, Christian married his second wife, Princess Caroline Amalie of Schleswig-Holstein-Sonderburg-Augustenburg (daughter of Louise Augusta of Denmark, the only sister of Frederick VI) at Augustenborg Palace on 22 May 1815. The couple was childless and lived in comparative retirement as leaders of the literary and scientific society of Copenhagen until Christian ascended the throne of Denmark.

Christian had ten extramarital children, for whom he carefully provided. It has been suggested that these extramarital children included the fairy tale author Hans Christian Andersen, though there is little evidence to support this.

King of Denmark 

On 3 December 1839 he ascended the Danish throne as Christian VIII. The Liberal party had high hopes of "the giver of constitutions." However, by this time, Christian had become more conservative, and disappointed his admirers by steadily rejecting every Liberal project. Administrative reform was the only reform he would promise. In his attitude to the growing national unrest in the twin duchies of Schleswig and Holstein he often seemed hesitant and half-hearted, which damaged his position there. It was not until 1846 that he clearly supported the idea of Schleswig being a Danish area.

King Christian VIII continued his predecessor's patronage of astronomy, awarding gold medals for the discovery of comets by telescope and financially supporting Heinrich Christian Schumacher with his publication of the scientific journal Astronomische Nachrichten. It was during his reign that the last remnants of Danish India, namely Tranquebar in the south and Serampore in Bengal, were sold to the British in 1845.

His only legitimate son, the future Frederick VII (1808–1863) was married three times, but produced no legitimate issue. Since he was apparently unlikely to beget heirs, Christian wished to avert a succession crisis. Christian commenced arrangements to secure the succession in Denmark. The result was the selection of the future Christian IX as hereditary prince, the choice made official by a new law enacted on 31 July 1853 after an international treaty made in London.

King Christian died of sepsis in Amalienborg Palace in 1848 and was interred in Roskilde Cathedral on the island of Zealand, the traditional burial site for Danish monarchs since the 15th century.

Some historians and biographers believe that King Christian would have given Denmark a free constitution had he lived long enough; his last words are sometimes recorded as "I didn't make it". (Jeg nåede det ikke)

Honours 
He received the following orders and decorations:

Notes

Ancestry

References

Citations

Bibliography

Obituary (astronomy)
 MNRAS 8 (1848) 62

External links

 The Royal Lineage at the website of the Danish Monarchy
 Christian VIII at the website of the Royal Danish Collection at Rosenborg Castle
 

1786 births
1848 deaths
Christian Frederick
Dukes of Saxe-Lauenburg
Dukes of Schleswig
Dukes of Holstein
House of Oldenburg in Denmark
Grand Commanders of the Order of the Dannebrog
Recipients of the Cross of Honour of the Order of the Dannebrog
Knights of the Golden Fleece of Spain
3
3
3
Grand Crosses of the Order of Saint Stephen of Hungary
Burials at Roskilde Cathedral
Christian Frederick
Christian Frederick
19th-century monarchs of Denmark
Monarchs who abdicated